The Manchester and Lawrence Railroad was a railroad company that was chartered in New Hampshire, United States, by businessmen from Manchester, to build a rail line from that city to the Massachusetts state line.

History

The Manchester and Lawrence was chartered in 1847 and opened in November 1849. It leased the newly built Methuen Branch from the Boston and Maine Railroad which opened in August 1849 and ran from South Lawrence through Methuen to the state line where the two lines met.

The B&M tried to lease the M&L, but the company leased itself to the Concord Railroad in 1850. This still helped the B&M as the railroad opened up a second Manchester to Boston route that helped the B&M compete with the combined Nashua and Lowell and Boston and Lowell Railroads. Within 1887, the contract was terminated, and the B&M gained control of the line.

In the 20th century, the line was relegated to local freight. Passenger service on the line dropped to one round trip per day until 1953 when regular passenger service ended. Special summer trains ran to Rockingham Park in Salem for the horse races until 1960 when that service stopped.

Despite rapid population growth in Rockingham County in the 1960s and '70s, rail traffic declined. On November 6, 1980, the section of the line from North Salem to Derry was temporarily taken out of service and later abandoned in 1984 by Guilford, having never been reactivated. In 1986 the line from Derry to Londonderry (Manchester Airport) was abandoned. Freight service between the Manchester railyard and the airport continued until 1989, when a severe washout crippled the railbed just north of Goffs Falls Road in South Manchester. Guilford continued to serve the remaining customers from the railyard to South Manchester until 1998. The entire remaining right-of-way from the railyard to Manchester Airport was abandoned in 2000, and the segment that ran through the airport was sold to extend one of the runways.

Freight continued to run on the southern end of the line from Lawrence to North Salem until December 1992, when the remaining customers in that part of town closed. Service from Lawrence to the Rockingham Park run-around siding in Salem continued until March 1999. The main line and passing track at the racetrack was removed immediately and was relocated south so that Guilford could continue to serve the last remaining customer while waiting for approval to abandon service from the Surface Transportation Board. All service north of the Lawrence city line ended in June 2001 when Guilford delivered two covered hoppers to leave behind in Salem and picked up empties. A small stretch in Lawrence continued to see infrequent service until 2014. The portion of the line in Massachusetts (Lawrence and Methuen) is currently owned by the Massachusetts Bay Transit Authority (MBTA), and all track north of Lawrence has been removed, with some sections of rail still in place in Londonderry (just south of the airport) and staggered spots in Manchester.

The New Hampshire state rail plan of 2012 and the I-93 transit study stated that it could be feasible to revitalize the line up to Manchester for freight and commuter rail service.

Rail trail
The abandoned roadbed currently serves as a rail trail in Manchester, Londonderry, Derry, and Windham, as well as in Methuen.

References

External links 
 Map of the Manchester and Lawrence Railroad 

Defunct Massachusetts railroads
Defunct New Hampshire railroads
Methuen, Massachusetts
Predecessors of the Boston and Maine Railroad